Oreste Calleja (born 20 November 1946) is a Maltese playwright.

Biography
Oreste Calleja was born in Hamrun, Malta. He studied at the Lyceum Grammar School and St Michael's Teachers’ Training College (1964–66). He attended the University of London, Birkbeck College in 1974-75, and in 1990, studied at North Florida University and Jacksonville University, Florida, from where he obtained a BA in Fine Arts and French in 1990. In the 1960s, Calleja was a committee member of the Moviment Qawmien Letterarju, and after a short stint of writing in English, he started writing plays for the stage, radio, and television in Maltese. For several years his plays have featured in Maltese Literature national curricula in high schools and University courses.

Two of his plays, Pawlu Redux and Il-Festa bil-Bandieri, won the Malta National Book Award for drama. In 2011, a review in the Times of Malta called Calleja a "neglected Maltese playwright". Following in the tradition of Maltese playwright Francis Ebejer, Calleja's works depicted characters who were aspiring to a greater life but who inevitably faced insurmountable social and psychological hurdles.  His themcs are at once highly allegorical and ironic and … encompass a world both universal and local.

Plays

 Anestesija 1969
 Għargħar 1979
 Ċens Perpetwu 1969
 Satira 1970 • (above 4 plays published in "4 Drammi", 1972)
 Jum Fost l-Oħrajn 1970
 En Passant 1970
 Iġsmaiħirsa 1970
 Għasfur taċ-Ċomb 1993
 Il-Belliegħa fil-Bir 1994
 U l-Anġlu Ħabbar 1995
 Pawlu Redux 1999
 Il-Festa bil-Bandieri 2002
 Għażiż Angelo 2016
 Ċama Ċama, il-Monologi 2019
 And Unto Her An Angel - 2019

Screenplay series

Skart 2015
Siltiet 2015
Ghasfur taċ-Ċomb (the screenplay version) 2016
Addijo Ċesri 2017

References

Further reading
Schiavone, Michael. Maltese biographies of the twentieth century.

External links
 Official website

1946 births
Living people
20th-century Maltese writers
21st-century Maltese writers
Maltese dramatists and playwrights
English-language writers from Malta